Each of the 20 arrondissements of Paris is officially divided into 4 quartiers. Outside administrative use (census statistics and the localisation of post offices and other government services), they are very rarely referenced by Parisians themselves, and have no specific administration or political representation attached to them.

References

Bibliography

Districts of Paris
History of Paris
Arrondissements of Paris